Since the 16th century the island of Cuba had been under the control of the governor-captain general of Santo Domingo. The conquest of Cuba was organized in 1510 by the recently restored Viceroy of the Indies, Diego Colón, under the command of Diego Velázquez de Cuéllar, who became Cuba's first governor until his death in 1524. 

Velázquez founded the city of Nuestra Señora de la Asunción de Baracoa in 1511 and convoked a general cabildo (a local government council) to govern Cuba, which was authorized by the king of Spain.

Hernán Cortés's Spanish conquest of the Aztec Empire was undertaken from Cuba. Cuba was incorporated in New Spain after the conquest of Mexico.

References
Historia general de los hechos de los Castellanos en Las Islas Y Tierra firme

Spanish colonization of the Americas
Governorates of the Spanish Empire
1511 establishments in the Spanish Empire
1519 disestablishments in the Spanish Empire
1519 disestablishments in North America
States and territories established in 1511
States and territories disestablished in 1521